Norman Aaron Black (born December 3, 1996) is a Filipino-American professional basketball player for the Meralco Bolts of the Philippine Basketball Association (PBA). He won the PBA Outstanding Rookie award in 2021. He is the son of former PBA Best Import Norman Black, who is also the head coach of Meralco.

College career 
After playing in high school for the Ateneo Blue Eaglets, Black committed to the senior team of Ateneo. He didn't play that season as he was a team captain for the Philippine team in the 2014 FIBA Asia U-18 Championship.

He made his college debut the next season, scoring 11 points in a win over the Adamson Soaring Falcons. He scored 13 points in 13 minutes to extend Ateneo's win streak to five against the De La Salle Green Archers. His team lost in the semis that season to the FEU Tamaraws.

With Season 78 MVP Kiefer Ravena graduating, Black transitioned from role player to one of the Eagles' top players. In their first game of Season 79, he had a game-high 23 points and a win against the UST Growling Tigers. In a game against FEU, he injured his left foot, causing him to sit out for three weeks. He returned in a win against the UE Red Warriors. He scored 16 points to help Ateneo prevent La Salle from sweeping the elimination round. For that performance, he was named Player of the Week. They lost in the Finals to La Salle.

In Seasons 80 and 81, Black saw his stats dip under Coach Tab Baldwin, but was still a reliable contributor as Ateneo won back-to-back titles. He forwent his final playing year.

Professional career

Quezon City Capitals (2019) 
After playing for Ateneo, he next played for the Quezon City Capitals in the Maharlika Pilipinas Basketball League. He tallied 17 points, 11 rebounds, and 10 assists for a triple-double in a win against the Binan City Laguna Heroes. Black averaged 11.8 points, 7.4 rebounds, and 5.4 assists in the 14 games that he played for Quezon City.

AMA Online Education Titans (2019) 
In 2019, Black played for the AMA Online Education Titans in the semi-professional PBA D-League Foundation Cup. He had 25 points, 15 rebounds, and 11 assists in his debut. In their first win, he registered 26 points, 16 rebounds, and 14 assists, becoming only the third player in that league's history to rack up multiple triple-doubles after Mike Tolomia (twice) and Jeron Teng (thrice). He cooled down slightly as AMA lost to Marinerong Pilipino, with only 12 points, 10 rebounds, and 6 assists. He had another triple-double with 45 points, 18 assists, and 12 rebounds as AMA qualified for the quarterfinals. He closed his D-League stint with 22 points as Marinerong Pilipino eliminated them.

Zamboanga Family's Brand Sardines (2019–2020) 
Black was traded to the Zamboanga Family's Brand Sardines where he became teammates with future Meralco teammate Alvin Pasaol.

Meralco Bolts (2020–present) 
In the 2019 PBA Draft, Black was drafted 18th overall by the Meralco Bolts, who are coached by his father, Norman Black. In the Bolts' first win, he produced 8 points, 2 rebounds and 2 assists, which was better than his losing debut of 6 points, 3 assists, and 2 turnovers. He contributed 16 points on 6-of-10 shooting, 4 rebounds, 4 assists, and a steal in an overtime win against the Magnolia Hotshots. He copped a Rookie of the Week honor as Meralco started the year 3–1. They finished 7–4, qualifying for the playoffs as a 5th seed and playing against the San Miguel Beermen. In Game 1, he dropped 11 of his 14 points in the fourth quarter as Meralco defeated San Miguel, 78–71, and forced a rubber match for a semis seat. They clinched a spot in the semifinals with a dominating 90–68 win. In the semis, they lost in 5 games to the Barangay Ginebra San Miguel, with Scottie Thompson preventing Meralco from going to the Finals. He finished the season by winning the Rookie of the Year Award, becoming the lowest draft pick to do so. He was also named to the All-Rookie Team.

On May 24, 2022, he signed a two-year extension with the team.

PBA career statistics

As of the end of 2021 season

Season-by-season averages

|-
| align=left | 
| align=left | Meralco
| 18 || 17.8 || .389 || .347 || .692 || 3.7 || 1.7 || .3 || .0 || 6.6
|-
| align=left | 
| align=left | Meralco
| 31 || 23.7 || .398 || .271 || .641 || 3.5 || 2.1 || .4 || .2 || 8.5
|-class=sortbottom
| align="center" colspan=2 | Career
| 49 || 21.5 || .395 || .295 || .656 || 3.6 || 1.9 || .4 || .1 || 7.8

National team career 
Black was a team captain for the Philippine team in the 2014 FIBA Asia U-18 Championship. He also played for Mighty Sports in the 2019 William Jones Cup.

Notes

References

External links
PBA.ph profile

1996 births
Living people
21st-century African-American sportspeople
African-American basketball players
American men's basketball players
Ateneo Blue Eagles men's basketball players
Filipino men's basketball players
Filipino people of African-American descent
Maharlika Pilipinas Basketball League players
Meralco Bolts draft picks
Meralco Bolts players
Point guards
Shooting guards